Frank Andrew Clague (July 13, 1865 – March 25, 1952) was a U.S. Representative from Minnesota.  He was born in Warrensville, Cuyahoga County, Ohio; attended the common schools; moved to Minnesota in 1881; attended the State normal school at Mankato 1882 – 1885; taught school at Springfield, Minnesota, 1886 – 1890; studied law; was admitted to the bar in 1891 and commenced practice in Lamberton, Redwood County, Minnesota, the same year; prosecuting attorney of Redwood County, Minnesota, 1895 – 1903; member of the Minnesota House of Representatives from January 1, 1903, to January 1, 1907, serving as speaker in the 1905 session; served in the Minnesota Senate from January 1, 1907, to December 31, 1915; judge of the ninth judicial district of Minnesota from January 1, 1919, to March 1, 1920, when he resigned; elected as a Republican to the 67th, 68th, 69th, 70th, 71st, and 72nd congresses, (March 4, 1921 – March 3, 1933); was not a candidate for renomination in 1932; resumed the practice of law and also engaged in agricultural pursuits until his retirement; died in Redwood Falls, Minnesota, March 25, 1952; interment in Redwood Falls Cemetery.

References
Minnesota Legislators Past and Present

1865 births
1952 deaths
Republican Party members of the Minnesota House of Representatives
Republican Party Minnesota state senators
Speakers of the Minnesota House of Representatives
American Episcopalians
Republican Party members of the United States House of Representatives from Minnesota
People from Lamberton, Minnesota